The Bastion Range is a small mountain range at the northeastern corner of Garibaldi Provincial Park in the Garibaldi Ranges of the Pacific Ranges of the Coast Mountains in southwestern British Columbia, Canada.  Overlooking Lillooet Lake, it has an area of 50 km2.

See also
List of mountain ranges

References

Garibaldi Ranges